Eremophila annosicaulis is a plant in the figwort family, Scrophulariaceae and is endemic to a small area of Western Australia. It grows on low, rocky hills near Laverton.

Description
At the top of the trunk a number of branches separate, each very rough due to the remains of the leaf bases and is densely covered with many glandular hairs. They are linear in shape, almost circular in cross section and are covered with many glandular hairs.

There are 5 petals joined at their bases to form a tube. The inside of the tube is white with purplish spots. The outside of the tube and lobes are hairy and the inside of the tube is also very hairy. There are four stamens which do not extend beyond the end of the tube.

Taxonomy and naming
The species was first formally described by Robert Chinnock in 2007 as Eremophila annosocaule and the description was published in Eremophila and allied genera : a monograph of the plant family Myoporaceae. The type specimen was collected by Chinnock near the turnoff to the Mount Morgans Gold Mine. In 2007 the name was changed to Eremophila annosicaulis. The specific epithet (annosicaulis) means "long-lived stem", referring to the very old, weathered stems of the type specimen and characteristic of this species.

Distribution and habitat
Eremophila annosicaulis occurs on low, stony hills between Laverton and Lake Carnegie in the Murchison biogeographic region where the type specimen was collected. It is abundant in that small area but active mining occurs nearby. It grows in association with Acacia shrubs.

Conservation status
Eremophila annosicaulis is classified as "Priority Three" by the Government of Western Australia Department of Biodiversity, Conservation and Attractions, meaning that it is poorly known and known from only a few locations but is not under imminent threat.

References

annosicaulis
Eudicots of Western Australia
Plants described in 2007
Endemic flora of Western Australia
Taxa named by Robert Chinnock